Majid Al Ansari (born 1987), is an Emirati filmmaker. He is best known as the director of critically acclaimed film Zinzana: Rattle the Cage and Netflix's first Egyptian television series Paranormal.

Personal life
Al Ansari was born in 1987 in Abu Dhabi, UAE to an Emirati father and Kuwaiti mother. At the age of 16, he decided to study film, while watching the popular anime series Bleach.

Al Ansari studied music at California State University, Long Beach before entering cinema. He was a counsellor at the American International School.

Career
After graduation, Al Ansari got a scholarship from the government to attend second semester in New York Film Academy, but later dropped out. He started film at the old Abu Dhabi Film Commission under David Shepherd. In 2008, Al Ansari went on his first set for a commercial as a trainee assistant, which was shocking for him and he nearly gave up. At the age of 21, Al Ansari worked on his first short film Colors, which was a cinematography-based film.

Al Ansari then moved to work at Image Nation in 2010. Part of his job at Image Nation was to read scripts and find things that they could adapt. During this period, he moved to Africa and attended the Maisha Film Lab in Uganda, a non-profit training initiative for emerging East African film-makers. After returning to UAE, he made his maiden short film The Intruder!.

Ansari made his feature debut film Zinzana: Rattle the Cage in 2015. It’s is a contained thriller that takes place entirely in a prison. The film had its world premiere at Fantastic Fest in Austin, TX, and then European premier at BFI London Film Festival. The film received critical acclaim and later won the award for the Best Arab Filmmaker of the Year at the 2016 Berlin International Film Festival. The film was then picked up by IM Global for world-wide representation, and sold to Netflix as the first Arab film acquisition. The film is reportedly the first film of its genre to be produced in the United Arab Emirates. After the success of the film, he worked as an executive producer on three major Arab films: Shabab Sheyab, Rashid & Rajab, and Scales, the latter of which premiered at the Venice International Film Festival Critics Week in 2019 and won the Club Verona award for most innovative film.

In 2020, Majid directed three episodes of the critically acclaimed Netflix series Paranormal. The series, based on Ahmed Khaled Tawfik's renowned novels, was the first Egyptian original series for the global streaming platform and was a top trending series following its November release.

Partial filmography

References

External links
 
 Dubai Fest: Director Majid Al Ansari on His Neo-Noir ‘Cage’
 ‘Zinzana’ Helmer Majid Majid Al-Ansari Receives Mid-East Filmmaker of the Year Awards

Living people
1988 births
Emirati film directors
Emirati people